Forfang is a Norwegian surname. Notable people with the surname include:

Åsmund Forfang (born 1952), Norwegian writer
Daniel Forfang (born 1979), Norwegian ski jumper
Halvard Grude Forfang (1914–1987), Norwegian educator
Johann André Forfang (born 1995), Norwegian ski jumper
Ole Forfang (born 1995), Norwegian cyclist

Norwegian-language surnames